Qiu Zhongyi (born 23 February 1996) is a Chinese footballer who plays as a  defender for Nantong Zhiyun.

Career

As a youth player, Qiu joined the youth academy of Australian side South East Piranha FC. At the age of 17, he joined the youth academy of Argentinos Juniors in the Argentine top flight, where he said, "compared with Australian football, the level of the Argentine game is higher and the pace is faster, and most of the offense is done through ground cooperation. At the same time, the Argentine team often pursues an all-attack and all-defense tactic, and the cooperation between the players is very tacit. The competition to play in Argentina is very fierce. Because many players are from slums, playing is the only way for them to change their lives, so they are very hard and serious about training and games."

After that, Qiu joined the youth academy of Argentine third division side UAI Urquiza. Before the 2021 season, he signed for Nantong Zhiyun in China. On 19 August 2021, he debuted for Nantong Zhiyun during a 0-6 loss to Heilongjiang Ice City, however this result was reversed after Heilongjiang failed to fielded an Under 23 youth  player. He would go on to be a squad player as the club gained promotion to the top tier at the end of the 2022 China League One season.

Career statistics 
Statistics accurate as of match played 31 December 2022.

References

External links
 
 

Chinese footballers
Chinese expatriate footballers
Chinese expatriate sportspeople in Australia
Living people
1996 births
Association football defenders
Nantong Zhiyun F.C. players
Expatriate soccer players in Australia
Expatriate footballers in Argentina